Francis Perekamoya (24 October 1957 – 11 January 2021) was a Malawian economist who served as the Governor of the Reserve Bank of Malawi from 1992 to 1995. Pelekamoya was Chairman of New Finance Bank until his death.

Perekamoya died from COVID-19 in January 2021.

References

1957 births
2021 deaths
Governors of the Reserve Bank of Malawi
Malawian bankers
20th-century Malawian economists
Deaths from the COVID-19 pandemic in Malawi